Christophe Samuel (born April 3, 1961 in Maintirano) was a Malagasy politician. He was a member of the Senate of Madagascar for Melaky, and a member of the Tiako I Madagasikara party.

He died of a heart attack in February 2017.

References

1961 births
2017 deaths
Members of the Senate (Madagascar)
Tiako I Madagasikara politicians
People from Melaky